DeVonte Dedmon (born November 23, 1995) is a professional gridiron football wide receiver and kick returner for the Ottawa Redblacks of the Canadian Football League (CFL).

College career
Dedmon played college football for the William & Mary Tribe from 2014 to 2018.

Professional career

Ottawa Redblacks
On May 22, 2019, it was announced that Dedmon had signed with the Ottawa Redblacks. He played in his first regular season game on July 19, 2019, against the Winnipeg Blue Bombers, where he recorded seven punt returns for 74 yards and five kickoff returns for 117 yards. He scored his first professional touchdown on a 111-yard kickoff return against the Montreal Alouettes on August 2, 2019. In the same game, he also scored with a 95-yard punt return touchdown and set a franchise record with 377 total return yards in the 30–27 overtime win. However, his rookie season was kept short due to injuries and he played in just five regular season games. He did not play in 2020 due to the cancellation of the 2020 CFL season.

On November 2, 2021, it was announced that Dedmon had signed a one-year contract extension with the Redblacks. In the team's next game, on November 6, 2021, Dedmon had a 100-yard kickoff return touchdown and set a CFL record as he recorded his fifth return touchdown in his first 15 career CFL games, surpassing Gizmo Williams' record of 18 games. For the 2021 season, Dedmon played in 11 regular season games and had 11 receptions for 103 yards and ten carries for 68 rushing yards and one touchdown. On special teams, he had 48 punt returns for 737 yards and two touchdowns, 49 kickoff returns for 1,223 yards and one touchdown, and four missed field goal returns for 103 yards. For his strong season, he was named the CFL's Most Outstanding Special Teams Player. He was also named as a league and divisional all-star. He was released on January 26, 2022, so that he could pursue opportunities in the National Football League.

Miami Dolphins
On January 27, 2022, Dedmon signed a reserve/future contract with the Miami Dolphins of the NFL. He was released on August 16, 2022.

Ottawa Redblacks (II)
On August 20, 2022, it was announced that Dedmon had re-signed with the Ottawa Redblacks. After joining the team partway through the 2022 season Dedmon only played in six games. He returned 13 punts and eight kickoffs. Dedmon also caught eight passes for 58 yards and carried the ball twice for five yards. On January 3, 2023 Dedmon and the Redblacks agreed to a  two-year contract extension.

References

External links
Ottawa Redblacks bio

1995 births
Living people
American football defensive backs
American players of Canadian football
Players of American football from Virginia
Sportspeople from Williamsburg, Virginia
Canadian football wide receivers
William & Mary Tribe football players
Ottawa Redblacks players
Miami Dolphins players